Francisco Zumel (ca. 1540-1607) was a Spanish philosopher and ecclesiastic.  He was superior general of the Mercedarian Order and professor of physics and moral philosophy at the University of Salamanca.  He was a Thomist and is most remembered for his polemical writings against the molinistas, the followers of Luis Molina.

His works were written in Latin and some of them remain in the Vatican Library, and thus far unpublished.

External links
 Francisco Zumel

1540 births
1607 deaths
Academic staff of the University of Salamanca
16th-century Spanish philosophers
School of Salamanca
16th-century Spanish Roman Catholic theologians
17th-century Spanish philosophers
17th-century Spanish Roman Catholic theologians